Bratislava tram network serves Bratislava (the capital city of Slovakia). It is operated by Dopravný podnik Bratislava, a. s and the system is known as Mestská hromadná doprava (MHD, municipal mass transit).

Trams in the city have been electrically powered since the system was opened in 1895; there were never any horse-driven or steam-powered trams in Bratislava. It is the one of two urban tram systems in Slovakia with the other system located in Košice. Conversions to standard-gauge railway have been proposed in the past, but the network uses narrow-gauge  track also known as metre-gauge.

History

Beginnings

Permission was granted in the 1890s for Bratislava to open its first tram line. First line was inaugurated on 27 August 1895, and took the route from today's SNP Bridge to Hodžov Square. There were 9 vehicles in operation that were powered by a current of 550 V. Construction of new sections continued, and in September 1895, a second line was opened to the main station, more than 3km long. Several other lines were opened in January of the following year. Horse bus services were retired as a result.

Second World War

After the outbreak of the war, transport demands were sharply increased which had an effect on tram services. Night services had to be cancelled after 10 pm. In 1941, construction of the tunnel under Bratislava Castle, which is now used by trams, began. The tunnel construction took 8 years and the tunnel was put into operation in 1949. During the Second World War, it served as an anti-aircraft cover and was later used by car transport and pedestrians. Since 1983, it has been designed exclusively for trams.

In 1942, classic pantographs were installed on the network. Two more years later, the number designation of tram lines and other modes of transport was introduced. Just before and during the Red Army's occupation of the city in 1945, all public transport, including the railroad, was halted in the city. After the liberation, 90% of the network was damaged, and extensive repairs began to correct this.

Socialist era

In 1950s, first 6MT trams appeared. The track from Karlova Ves was doubled and the last monorail section disappeared. Since 1952, the number of lines has increased to five.

Post-communism

Tram lines of a fast-lane character (Rača, 1988) were opened on the just-completed housing estates. In the same year, the operation of Tatra T2 trams was terminated and the construction of the metro started but it was stopped a year later.

Plans were proposed to swap Bratislava's tram tracks into a  standard-gauge track. At the time in the former Czechoslovakia, only networks in Bratislava in Liberec featured this track gauge. The 1990s marked the modernisation of the rolling stock (K2S, T3G, T3Mod, etc.) and brand new trams of the Tatra T6A5 type were delivered between 1991 and 1997. At this time, however, the tram network became very congested, both for reasons of financial savings and by extending the intervals, and also because there was still no carrier system of public transport.

Recent times

After more than 20 years of metro proposals floating, in 2002, all plans for the metro were officially cancelled and preparations began to replace it with rapid transit trams. 

However, the first steps were only taken in 2006 when the Petržalka tram project was submitted for an environmental impact assessment and the first steps were taken for the start of construction. The start of construction was planned for the summer of 2007. At a similar time, Škoda 06 T trams have been tested in Bratislava.

Opponents argued that this solution was not feasible due to the differences between the voltage used by trams and trains.

A new proposal for the development of tram lines was also presented to the City Hall the same year. In addition to the Petržalka expansion, with the new proposal trams could also reach the city district of Vajnory, Devínska Nová Ves (extension of the line from the Pri Kríži stop to Dúbravka and around the housing estate in Devínska Nová Ves to the Volkswagen plant) and Vrakuňa. The new lines would also lead to Prievoz and Mlynská Dolina.

Between 2013 and 2015, the first stage of the construction of the tramway to Petržalka over the Old Bridge took place. The Old Bridge was rebuilt, Štúrova Street was reconstructed and the tramway itself was built to Bosákova Street.

Funds were also used to buy thirty air conditioned low-floor Škoda 30T trams and thirty Škoda 29T trams. With this signing, DPB completed three large tenders for electric traction vehicles. In addition to trams, DPB also bought trolleybuses. The modernisation programme of Tatra K2 vehicles was completed and since 1 February 2010 only renovated or new Tatra K2S and Tatra K2G cars have been running on Bratislava's rails.

On 15 June 2020, a reconstruction started on the section between the stops Cintorín Rača and Záhumenice on Račianska radial. The reconstructed line was opened on 7 September 2020.

Future 

Currently, there is an on-going construction of prolongation in Petržalka city part. The construction work is expected to finish in 2024.

Routes 

The colours of the lines correspond to the markings in the timetables and transport schemes of the Bratislava Transport Company.

Ticketing

Infrastructure

Depots

The network has two depots: Vozovňa Jurajov Dvor and Vozovňa Krasňany. The first depot was opened in the 1950s, with the second opening in 1973.

Power supply

The tram network is powered by a DC voltage of 600 V; the positive pole is in the trolleys (pantograph) with the negative pole in the rails.

Rolling stock
The fleet consists exclusively of trams of Czech or Czechoslovak production from the defunct manufacturer ČKD and Škoda Transportation. Older wagons are modernized.

See also
 History of Bratislava
 Public transport in Bratislava

References

Bibliography

External links
 Dopravný podnik Bratislava, a. s.
 imhd.sk: Bratislava

600 V DC railway electrification
Bratislava